The DnaX ribosomal frameshifting element is a RNA element found in the mRNA of the dnaX gene in E. coli. The dnaX gene has two encoded products, tau and gamma, which are produced in a 1:1 ratio. The gamma protein is synthesised due to programmed frameshifting and is shorter than tau. The two products of the dnaX gene are DNA polymerase III subunits.

References

External links 
 

Cis-regulatory RNA elements